Årjäng Municipality (Årjängs kommun) is a municipality in Värmland County in west central Sweden, bordering Norway. Its seat is located in the town of Årjäng.

A separate local government entity named Årjäng was created in 1941 when it was detached from Silbodal. In 1952 the two were reunited under the name of Årjäng. In 1971 Sillerud and Holmedal were amalgamated with Årjäng. In 1974 Töcksmark was added, expanding the municipality to its current size. The municipality contains two localities, Årjäng and Töcksfors. Known Swedish sportsmen from this municipality are Per-Gunnar Andersson and Thomas Wassberg.

See also 
Egenäs

References

External links

Årjäng Municipality - Official site

Municipalities of Värmland County